Agnieszka Radwańska was the defending champion, but lost in the third round to Daria Kasatkina.

Caroline Garcia won the title, defeating Simona Halep in the final, 6–4, 7–6(7–3). As of 2019, Garcia is the only player to win singles titles in both Wuhan and Beijing in the same year.

As a result of Garbiñe Muguruza's retirement in the first round, Halep attained the WTA no. 1 singles ranking for the first time at the end of the tournament after having defeated Jeļena Ostapenko in the semifinals.

Seeds

The three Wuhan semifinalists who were accepted into the main draw received a bye into the second round. They were as follows:
  Ashleigh Barty
  Caroline Garcia
  Jeļena Ostapenko
Maria Sakkari, the fourth Wuhan semifinalist, did not have a ranking that qualified her for the main draw. Sakkari withdrew from the qualifying draw as she was still competing in Wuhan.

Draw

Finals

Top half

Section 1

Section 2

Bottom half

Section 3

Section 4

Qualifying

Seeds

Qualifiers

Draw

First qualifier

Second qualifier

Third qualifier

Fourth qualifier

Fifth qualifier

Sixth qualifier

Seventh qualifier

Eighth qualifier

References

External links
 Main Draw
 Qualifying Draw

China Open - Singles